The religious perspectives on Jesus vary among world religions. Jesus' teachings and the retelling of his life story have significantly influenced the course of human history, and have directly or indirectly affected the lives of billions of people, even non-Christians. He is considered by many to be one of the most influential persons to have ever lived, finding a significant place in numerous cultural contexts.
 
Christianity teaches that Jesus is the Messiah (Christ) foretold in the Old Testament and the Son of God. Christians believe that through his death and resurrection, humans can be reconciled to God and thereby are offered salvation and the promise of eternal life. These teachings emphasize that as the willing Lamb of God, Jesus chose to suffer in Calvary as a sign of his full obedience to the will of his Father, as an "agent and servant of God". Christians view Jesus as a role model, whose God-focused life believers are encouraged to imitate.

In Islam, Jesus (commonly transliterated as Isa) is one of God's highest-ranked and most-beloved prophets. Islam considers Jesus to be neither the incarnation nor the Son of God. Islamic texts emphasize a strict notion of monotheism (tawhid) and forbid the association of partners with God, which would be idolatry (shirk).

In the Druze faith, Jesus is considered one of God's important prophets and the Messiah.

The Baháʼí Faith considers Jesus to be one of many manifestations of God, who are a series of personages who reflect the attributes of the divine into the human world. Baháʼís reject the idea that divinity was contained with a single human body.

Apart from his own disciples and followers, the Jews of Jesus' day generally rejected him as the Messiah, as do the great majority of Jews today. Mainstream Jewish scholars argue that Jesus neither fulfilled the Messianic prophecies in the Tanakh nor embodied the personal qualifications of the Messiah.
Sikhism views Jesus as a high-ranked Holy man or saint. 

Other world religions such as Buddhism have no particular view on Jesus, and have but a minor intersection with Christianity. For non-religious perspectives on Jesus, see historical Jesus.

Christianity

Christian views of Jesus are based on the teachings and beliefs as outlined in the Canonical gospels, New Testament letters, the Christian creeds, as well as specific denominational teachings. These documents outline the key beliefs held by Christians about Jesus, including his divinity, humanity, and earthly life, and that he is the Christ and the Son of God.

Although Christian views of Jesus vary, it is possible to summarize the key beliefs shared among major denominations, as stated in their catechetical or confessional texts. Generally speaking, adhering to the Christian faith requires a belief that Jesus is the Son of God and the Messiah or Christ. Jesus refers to himself as the Son of God in the New Testament.

Christians consider Jesus to be the Messiah (Christ) and believe that through his death and resurrection, humans can be reconciled to God and thereby are offered salvation and the promise of eternal life. These teachings emphasize that as the willing Lamb of God, Jesus chose to suffer in Calvary as a sign of his full obedience to the will of his Father, as an "agent and servant of God". The choice Jesus made thus counter-positions him as a new man of morality and obedience, in contrast to Adam's disobedience.

The five major milestones in the gospel narrative of the life of Jesus are his Baptism, Transfiguration, Crucifixion, Resurrection and Ascension. These are usually bracketed by two other episodes: his Nativity at the beginning and the sending of the Paraclete at the end. The gospel accounts of the teachings of Jesus are often presented in terms of specific categories involving his "works and words", e.g. his ministry, parables and miracles.  The words of Jesus include several sermons, in addition to parables that appear throughout the narrative of the Synoptic Gospels (the gospel of John includes no parables).

Christians not only attach theological significance to the works of Jesus, but also to his name. Devotions to the Holy Name of Jesus go back to the earliest days of Christianity.<ref name=Sylvester >Outlines of dogmatic theology, Volume 2 by Sylvester Hunter 2010  page 443</ref> These devotions and feasts exist both in Eastern and Western Christianity.

Incarnation

Most Christians believe that Jesus was both human and the Son of God. While there have been theological debate over the nature of Jesus, Trinitarian Christians generally believe that Jesus is God incarnate, God the Son, and "true God and true man" (or both fully divine and fully human). Jesus, having become fully human in all respects, suffered the pains and temptations of a mortal man, yet he did not sin. As fully God, he defeated death and rose to life again. According to the Bible, God raised him from the dead. He ascended to heaven, to the "right hand of God," and he will return again for the Last Judgment and the establishment of the Kingdom of God.

Islam

In Islam, Jesus (Isa) is considered to be a messenger of God (Allah) and the Messiah (al-Masih) who was sent to guide the Descendants of Israel (Bani Isra'il) with a new scripture, the Gospel (Injil).

The Quran mentions Jesus by name 25 times—more often than Muhammad—and emphasises that Jesus was a mortal human who, like all other prophets, had been divinely chosen to spread God's message. Unlike Christian writings, the Quran does not describe Jesus as the son of God, but as one of four major human messengers (out of many prophets) sent by God throughout history to guide mankind. Jesus is said to have lived a life of piety and generosity, and abstained from eating flesh of swine.

Muslims also believe that Jesus received a Gospel from God, called the Injil. However, Muslims hold that Jesus' original message was lost or altered and that the Christian New Testament does not accurately represent God's original message to mankind.

Despite major differences, the Quran and New Testament overlap in other aspects of Jesus' life; both Muslims and Christians believe that Jesus was miraculously born without a human biological father by the will of God, and that his mother, Mary (Maryam in Arabic), is among the most saintly, pious, chaste and virtuous women ever. The Quran also specifies that Jesus was able to perform miracles—though only by the will of God—including being able to raise the dead, restore sight to the blind and cure lepers. One miracle attributed to Jesus in the Quran, but not in the New Testament, is his being able to speak at only a few days old, to defend his mother from accusations of adultery. It also says that Jesus was a 'word' from God, since he was predicted to come in the Old Testament.

Most Muslims believe that he was neither killed nor crucified, but that God made it appear so to his enemies. With the noteworthy exception of Ahmadi Muslims who believe that Jesus was indeed put on the cross, survived the crucifixion and was not lifted bodily to the heaven, majority of Muslims believe that Jesus ascended bodily to heaven and is alive. Some Muslim scholars maintain that Jesus was indeed put up on the cross, but did not die on it; rather, he revived and then ascended bodily to heaven. Others say that it was actually Judas Iscariot who was mistakenly crucified by the Romans. Regardless, Muslims believe that Jesus is alive in heaven and will return to the world in the flesh to defeat the Antichrist, once the world has become filled with sin, deception and injustice, and then live out the rest of his natural life.

Islam rejects the Trinitarian Christian view that Jesus was God incarnate or the son of God, that he was ever crucified or resurrected or that he ever atoned for the sins of mankind. The Quran says that Jesus himself, when asked by God if he said that people shall regard him and Mary as gods, will deny this.

Judaism

Judaism rejects the idea of Jesus being God, or a person of a Trinity, or a mediator to God. Judaism also holds that Jesus is not the Messiah, arguing that he had not fulfilled the Messianic prophecies in the Tanakh nor embodied the personal qualifications of the Messiah. According to Jewish tradition, there were no more prophets after Malachi, who lived centuries before Jesus and delivered his prophesies about 420 BC/BCE.

According to Conservative Judaism, Jews who believe Jesus is the Messiah have "crossed the line out of the Jewish community". Reform Judaism, the modern progressive movement, states "For us in the Jewish community anyone who claims that Jesus is their savior is no longer a Jew and is an apostate".

Jesus in Jewish writings

The Babylonian Talmud include stories of Yeshu ; the vast majority of contemporary historians disregard these as sources on the historical Jesus. Contemporary Talmud scholars view these as comments on the relationship between Judaism and Christians or other sectarians, rather than comments on the historical Jesus.Jeffrey Rubenstein Rabbinic Stories (The Classics of Western Spirituality) New York: The Paulist Press, 2002

The Mishneh Torah, an authoritative work of Jewish law, states in Hilkhot Melakhim 11:10–12 that Jesus is a "stumbling block" who makes "the majority of the world err to serve a divinity besides God".

Baháʼí Faith
The Baháʼí Faith consider Jesus to be a manifestation of God, who are a series of personages who reflect the attributes of the divine into the human world for the progress and advancement of human morals and civilization. In Baháʼí belief, the Manifestations have always been sent by God, and always will, as part of the single progressive religion from God bringing more teachings through time to help humanity progress. The Manifestations of God are taught to be "one and the same", and in their relationship to one another have both the station of unity and the station of distinction. In this way each Manifestation of God manifested the Word of God and taught the same religion, with modifications for the particular audience's needs and culture. Bahá'u'lláh wrote that since each Manifestation of God has the same divine attributes, they can be seen as the spiritual "return" of all the previous Manifestations of God. In this way, Baháʼís believe that Bahá'u'lláh is, in both respects, the return of Jesus.

Druze Faith

In the Druze faith, Jesus is considered one of God's important prophets and the Messiah, being among the seven prophets who appeared in different periods of history. The Druze venerate Jesus "the son of Joseph and Mary" and his four disciples, who wrote the Gospels. In the Druze tradition, Jesus is known under three titles: the True Messiah (al-Masih al-Haq), the Messiah of all Nations (Masih al-Umam''), and the Messiah of Sinners. This is due, respectively, to the belief that Jesus delivered the true Gospel message, the belief that he was the Saviour of all nations, and the belief that he offers forgiveness. 

According to the Druze manuscripts Jesus is the Greatest Imam and the incarnation of Ultimate Reason (Akl) on earth and the first cosmic principle (Hadd), and regards Jesus and Hamza ibn Ali as the incarnations of one of the five great celestial powers, who form part of their system. Druze believe that Hamza ibn Ali was a reincarnation of Jesus, and that Hamza ibn Ali is the true Messiah, who directed the deeds of the messiah Jesus "the son of Joseph and Mary", but when Jesus "the son of Joseph and Mary" strayed from the path of the true Messiah, Hamza filled the hearts of the Jews with hatred for him - and for that reason, they crucified him, according to the Druze manuscripts. Despite this, Hamza ibn Ali took him down from the cross and allowed him to return to his family, in order to prepare men for the preaching of his religion.

In an epistle ascribed to one of the founders of Druzism, Baha al-Din al-Muqtana, probably written sometime between AD 1027 and AD 1042, accused the Jews of crucifying Jesus.

Other
Traditionally, Buddhists as a group take no particular view on Jesus, and Buddhism and Christianity have but a minor intersection. However, some scholars have noted similarities between the life and teachings of Gautama Buddha and Jesus. These similarities might be attributed to Buddhist missionaries sent as early as Emperor Ashoka around 250 BCE in many of the Greek Seleucid kingdoms that existed then and then later became the same regions in which Christianity began. 

Jesus was seen as the saviour and bringer of gnosis by various Gnostic sects, such as the quasi-extinct Manichaeism. 

The Vietnamese syncretic religion Cao Dai locates Jesus in the celestial Council of Great Spirits that directs the universe.

In the Ahmadiyya Islamic view, Jesus survived the crucifixion and later travelled to India, where he lived as a prophet (and died) under the name of Yuz Asaf.

According to The Urantia Book, Jesus was one of numerous sons of God named Michael of Nebadon, who took on earthly incarnation.

In Raëlism, Jesus and several other religious figures are considered prophets sent by an extraterrestrial race called the Elohim. 

The Religious Science movement considers Jesus to be a teacher of “Science of Mind”.

The Lacandon people of Central America acknowledge Äkyantho', the god of foreigners. He has a son named Hesuklistos (Jesus Christ) who is supposed to be the god of the foreigners. They recognize that Hesuklistos is a god but do not feel he is worthy of worship as he is a minor god.

Among the Malbars of the French island Réunion, a syncretism of Catholicism and Hinduism can develop.
Krishna Janmashtami, the birth day of Krishna is considered to be the date of birth of Jesus Christ. 

Some Hindu religious and political leaders viewed Jesus as a spiritual teacher (Āchārya).

See also
Christianity and world religions
Life of Jesus in the New Testament
Master Jesus

References

Further reading

 
Jesus